Lubiczyn may refer to the following villages in Poland:
 Lubiczyn, Lublin Voivodeship (east Poland)
 Lubiczyn, West Pomeranian Voivodeship (north-west Poland)